North American Bancard (NAB) is a payments technology company founded in 1992 by CEO/President Marc Gardner, it is headquartered in Troy, Michigan.  Its corporate office employs more than 1,200 people, plus, another 3,000 sales partners located throughout the U.S. NAB offers technologies in credit, debit, EBT, check conversion and guarantee, ATM, gift and loyalty cards, and online payments. The company processes more than $50 billion per year in electronic transactions for more than 350,000 merchants in all 50 states.

North American Bancard is also a foundation member of Automation Alley.

History

Since its inception in 1992, North American Bancard has grown into the 6th largest non-bank merchant acquirer in North America. 

In 2008, the Michigan Economic Development Corporation (MEDC) recommended the Michigan Economic Growth Authority (MEGA) approve a $21.5 million state tax credit to NAB.  The company moved its headquarters to a  building on Stephenson Hwy in fall of 2009. NAB reached 100,000 merchants in 2010, launched PayAnywhere in 2011, and acquired Inovio Payments, Rapid Capital Funding, and Electronic Payment Exchange in 2014. 

In 2016, NAB reached 1,000 employees for the first time. In 2017, NAB acquired Total Merchant Services.

Awards and nominations
Founder/CEO/President Marc Gardner received the Ernst & Young’s Entrepreneur of the Year award in 2008.

The Detroit Regional Chamber selected Gardner as a guest speaker at the 2009 Mackinac Policy Conference to discuss Michigan’s economic future and Gardner’s success as an entrepreneur.

The American Heart Association named North American Bancard as a 2010 Fit Friendly Gold Status company for their comprehensive wellness initiatives for their employees.

North American Bancard and its brand PayAnywhere were awarded for the category Design in Electronic and Digital Communications - Website by the International Association of Business Communicators Detroit in June 2011. 

North American Bancard was named ETA ISO of the Year in 2014.

Current
NAB currently employs more than 1,200 people in a 100,000+ sq. ft. corporate office in Troy, MI.

In June 2010, North American Bancard announced its acquisition of Point and Pay from Vesta Corp as a means to expanding into payment processing for the public sector and non-profits.

In January 2011, North American Bancard announced the launch of PayAnywhere, a mobile payment processing solution. In 2014, NAB acquired payment processor Electronic Payment Exchange. In June 2015, North American Bancard announced the launch of the newest version of its PayAnywhere Mobile credit card reader, a 3-in-1 credit card reader that was launched in Apple Stores. This version is compatible with iOS devices.

In March 2022, it was announced North American Bancard has acquired the Washington-headquartered B2B payment gateway provider, PayTrace.

References

Companies based in Troy, Michigan
Companies established in 1992
Credit cards
Payment service providers
1992 establishments in Michigan
Technology companies established in 1992
Financial services companies of the United States
Financial services companies established in 1992